Hamilton is an unincorporated community in Olive Township, St. Joseph County, in the U.S. state of Indiana.

History
Hamilton was originally called Terre Coupee, and under the latter name was platted in 1837. The name of Hamilton comes from  Hamilton's Tavern the community once contained. A post office opened under the name Terre Coupee in 1831, and remained in operation until it was discontinued in 1893.

Geography

References

Unincorporated communities in St. Joseph County, Indiana
Populated places established in 1837
Unincorporated communities in Indiana
1837 establishments in Indiana